"Hoy Es Domingo" (English: "Today is Sunday") is a Latin pop song written and performed by Argentine pop singer-songwriter Diego Torres released on July 10, 2015, as the first single off his eighth studio album Buena Vida. The track was co-written by Beatriz Luengo, Yotuel Romero and Antonio Rayo Gibo and features Panamanian artist Rubén Blades. "Hoy Es Domingo" received a nomination for Song of the Year at the 16th Latin Grammy Awards.

Music video
The music video was filmed in Panamá City and Buenos Aires, Argentina, and features Torres and Blades enjoying a "Sunday afternoon", eating and drinking. The video was directed by Gus Carballo.

Track listing

Charts

References

2015 singles
2015 songs
Diego Torres songs
Rubén Blades songs
Sony Music Latin singles
Spanish-language songs
Songs written by Diego Torres
Songs written by Beatriz Luengo
Songs written by Yotuel Romero
Songs written by Rayito